Vichy Communauté is the communauté d'agglomération, an intercommunal structure, centred on the town of Vichy. It is located in the Allier department, in the Auvergne-Rhône-Alpes region, central France. Created in 2017, its seat is in Vichy. Its area is 741.3 km2. Its population was 82,810 in 2019, of which 24,980 in Vichy proper.

Composition
The communauté d'agglomération consists of the following 39 communes:

Abrest
Arfeuilles
Arronnes
Bellerive-sur-Allier
Billy
Bost
Brugheas
Busset
La Chabanne
La Chapelle
Charmeil
Châtel-Montagne
Châtelus
Cognat-Lyonne
Creuzier-le-Neuf
Creuzier-le-Vieux
Cusset
Espinasse-Vozelle
Ferrières-sur-Sichon
La Guillermie
Hauterive
Laprugne
Lavoine
Magnet
Mariol
Le Mayet-de-Montagne
Molles
Nizerolles
Saint-Clément
Saint-Germain-des-Fossés
Saint-Nicolas-des-Biefs
Saint-Pont
Saint-Rémy-en-Rollat
Saint-Yorre
Serbannes
Seuillet
Vendat
Le Vernet
Vichy

Administration

Elected members 
The communauté d'agglomération is directed by a conseil communautaire composed of 77 members representing each of the member communes. Their proportional division is fixed by the prefectorial decree no 2669/2019 of 30 October 2019.

Presidency

See also 

 List of intercommunalities of the Allier department

References

Vichy
Vichy